The Transat Québec–Saint-Malo is a sailing transoceanic race taking place every four years, from Quebec City, Canada, to Saint-Malo, France. 
The first edition, in 1984, was organized to celebrate the 450th anniversary of Jacques Cartier's voyage from Saint-Malo to Quebec. The race is opened to crewed monohulls and multihulls of 40, 50 and 60 feet.

It has two particularities: It is the only west-to-east transatlantic race at this level, and it starts by going down the Saint Lawrence River for roughly 12% of its length.

In 2016 a new course record of 6 days, 1 hour and 17 minutes was set by Spindrift 2 skippered by :fr:Yann Guichard and Donna Bertarelli. This new time beats by almost 2 days the previous course record held by Loïck Peyron for 20 years.

Winners

1984 
 Loïc Caradec on Royale in  8 d 19 h 57 min
 Pierre Follenfant on Charente-Maritime  in 8 d 20 h 13 min
 Philippe Poupon on Fleury Michon  in 9 d 15 h 59 min

1988 
 Serge Madec on Jet Services in 7 d 21 h 35 min
 Loïck Peyron on Lada Poch in 10 d 23 h 40 min
 Bruno Peyron on VSD Paca  in 10 d 23 h 58 min

1992 
 Laurent Bourgnon on Primagaz in 8 d 5 h 49 min.
 Florence Arthaud on Groupe Pierre 1er in 8 d 7 h 17 min
 Paul Vatine on Haute-Normandie in  9 d 14 h 18 min

1996 
 Loïck Peyron on Fujicolor II in 7 d 20 h 24 min
 Francis Joyon on Banque Populaire in 7 d 23 h 28 min
 Paul Vatine on Région Haute-Normandie in 8 d 0 h 31 min

2000 
 Franck Cammas on Groupama in 9 d 23 h 16 min
 Marc Guillemot on Biscuits La Trinitaine in 9 d 23 h 26 min
 Yvan Bourgnon on Bayer en France in 9 d 23 h 43 min

2004 
 Karine Fauconnier on Sergio Tacchini in 7 d 21 h 00 min
 Franck Cammas on Groupama in 7 d 21 h 59 min
 Michel Desjoyeaux on Géant in 7 d 22 h 01 min

2008 
 Classe 50 feet Open (Multi50) :
 Franck-Yves Escoffier on Crêpes Whaou! in 11 d 3 h 19 min
 Pierre Antoine on Imagine 
 Hervé Cléris on Prince de Bretagne
 Class40 :
 Halvard Mabire on Pogo Structures 
 Oliver Krauss on Mistral Loisirs - Pôle santé Elior 
 Tanguy de Lamotte on NOVEDIA Group - S.E.T. environnement	
 FICO :
 Christophe Bullens on An Ocean of Smiles 
 Yannick Bestaven on Cervin ENR 
 Denis Douillez on Saint Malo Team

2012

Mono Class 40:

 1
Campagne de France
Halvard Mabire & Miranda Merron
France
03/08/2012 10:50
11j 17h 30m
3028,2
10,18
 2
Mare
Jörg Riechers
Allemagne
03/08/2012 12:21
11j 19h 1m
3094,5
10,13
 3
Eole Generation - GDF-SUEZ
Sébastien Rogues
France
03/08/2012 16:04
12j 0h 44m 43s
3098,9
9,93
 4
Geodis
Fabrice Amedeo & Armel Tripon
France
03/08/2012 17:52
12j 2h 32m 50s
3036,2
9,87
 5
Roaring forty 2
Michel Kleinjans
Belgique
03/08/2012 22:13
12j 4h 53m 8s
3043,8
9,79
 6
Comiris-Elior
Thierry Bouchard
France
03/08/2012 23:04
12j 5h 44m 5s
3063,7
9,76
 7
IXBlue
Stéphane Le Diraison
France
03/08/2012 23:07
12j 5h 47m 50s
3036,8
9,76
 8
Jack in the box
Aloys Le Claquin
France
04/08/2012 05:08
12j 11h 48m 58s
3102,1
9,56
 9
Groupe Picoty
Jacques Fournier
France
04/08/2012 07:04
12j 13h 44m 27s
3071,1
9,50
 10
Red
Mathias Blumencron
Allemagne
04/08/2012 07:56
12j 14h 36m 2s
3033,6
9,47
 11
Partouche
Christophe Coatnoan
France
04/08/2012 08:25
12j 15h 5m 33s
3087,9
9,46
 12
Bodacious Dream
David Rearick
Etats-Unis
04/08/2012 11:11
12j 17h 51m 45s
3074,8
9,37
 13
Sevenstar Yachttransport
Jean-Édouard Criquioche / Anna-Maria Renken
France
04/08/2012 14:59
12j 21h 39m 06s
3046
9,26
 14
Latitude Neige / Longitude Mer
Aurélien Ducroz
France
04/08/2012 15:32
12j 22h 12m 13s
3054
9,24
 15
EDF Energies Nouvelles
David Augeix
France
05/08/2012 03:44
13j 10h 24m 25s
3047
9,45
 16
Bleu
Éric Tabardel
Canada
05/08/2012 07:20
13j 14h 00m 08s
3111
8,79
 17
Transport COHERENCE
Benoit Parnaudeau
France
05/08/2012 10:44
13j 17h 24m 02s
3037
8,70
 18
Avis immobilier
Louis Duc
France
05/08/2012 12:17
13j 18h 57m 11s
3060
8,66
 19
Proximedia
Denis Van Weynbergh
Belgique
05/08/2012 22:57
14j 05h 37m 09s
3047
8,39
 20
Persévérance
Robert Patenaude
Canada
06/08/2012 16:45
14j 23h 25m 37s
3031
7,97

Open:

 1
Multi50
FenêtréA Cardinal 3
Erwan Leroux
France
01/08/2012 01:56
9j 14h 21m 5s
3287,6
12,59
 2
Multi60
Défi Saint-Malo Agglo
Gilles Lamiré
France
02/08/2012 14:09
11j 2h 34m 4s
3224,3
10,88
 3
Multi50
Vers un Monde sans SIDA
Erik Nigon
France
02/08/2012 14:30
11j 2h 55m 23s
3159,6
10,86
 4
Mono50
Vento di Sardegna*
Andrea Mura
Italie
03/08/2012 02:35
11j 15h 0m 59s
3086,9
10,39
 5
Mono65
Océan Phénix
Georges Leblanc
Canada
05/08/2012 14:36
14j 03h 1m 16s
3124
8,55

References

External links 

 Transat Quebec-Saint-Malo official site
 Transat Quebec-Saint-Malo organization changes

Transatlantic sailing competitions
Yachting races
Sailing competitions in Canada
Sailing competitions in France